ID&T is a Dutch entertainment and medium enterprise that was founded in the early 1990s. Their event Mysteryland is named the oldest electronic festival in the Netherlands, with later events like Trance Energy and  Sensation. It operates many of the largest electronic dance music events in the world. They were also involved in the editions of Tomorrowland up until 2013.

History

Early years and growth

ID&T stands for the initials of three founders of the company, Irfan van Ewijk, Duncan Stutterheim and Theo Lelie, all residents of Amsterdam. All three were experienced in organizing house, techno and trance parties when they created ID&T, and their goal is to organize the largest events in the Netherlands and the European electronic dance music scene. Their first big event was "The Final Exam" in the Utrecht Conference Center, with about 12,000 people in attendance.

Today, ID&T is one of the largest dance organizers in the Netherlands. Events organised by the company include Sensation in the Amsterdam Arena, with around 40,000 people. There are two editions, Sensation (formerly known as Sensation White) (house), happening in the first Saturday of July, where all attendees come dressed in white, and BLACK (formerly known as Sensation Black) (techno, hardstyle, and hardcore), happening in the Saturday thereafter, where all attendees wear in black.

Other parties include Mysteryland on the Floriade 2002 terrain near Hoofddorp, with around 50,000 people, Innercity in the Amsterdam RAI Exhibition and Convention Centre (45,000 people) with eight areas and several styles, happening in the middle of December, Thunderdome (hardcore techno and techno), Trance Energy, Bloomingdale and NJOY. Such parties last all night, from 11pm to 7am (except open-air ones), including laser shows and fireworks. ID&T also operated the ID&T Release magazine and the music download portal ID&T Dance Tunes.com. Since 2014 the music download portal went offline without prior notice. Currently only Dance-Tunes Radio is active, an online streaming service hosted from Belgium.
They organized the first event where a single DJ played all night long, with Tiësto in Gelredome on 11 May 2003. These events were organized again in the same venue on two subsequent nights on 29 and 30 October 2004 and again on 2 June 2007. The same happened at Ethias Arena in Hasselt (Belgium) on 6 Nov 2004 and 19 May 2007. The concerts in 2007 are named 'Elements of Life'.

They also collaborated with Q-Dance in the organization of "The One Man Show" concert of DJ Luna at the Gelredome in Arnhem.

On July 16, 2005, the first Sensation White was organized in Germany, at Arena AufSchalke in Gelsenkirchen. Together with the musical and theatre company Stage Entertainment (formerly Stage Holding) they created ID&T Germany as a joint venture. On April 16, 2005 the same event took place in Belgium.
In 2009, it was organized for the first time on two subsequent nights on 3 and 4 July in the Amsterdam Arena where the opening of the Wicked Wonderland took place.

Takeover by SFX/LiveStyle
In 2013, the American conglomerate SFX Entertainment acquired a 75% majority stake in ID&T. In December 2014, it was announced that ID&T would be a "creative partner" for Electric Zoo 2015 in New York City, which is also owned by SFX.

In 2016, SFX filed for Chapter 11 bankruptcy protection; the transition was not expected to impact ID&T's events, besides the U.S. TomorrowWorld event (whose fate had been in question following infrastructural issues that marred the 2015 edition). The company later emerged under new leadership as LiveStyle.

In 2021, LiveStyle sold ID&T to the British company Superstruct Entertainment, a company led by Cream co-founder James Barton that also owns Øyafestivalen and Sónar.

List of ID&T events

Awards and nominations

International Dance Music Awards

Notes

See also
List of electronic music festivals

References

External links

 The official ID&T website
 Trance Energy
 Sensation 
 Thunderdome

Electronic music festivals in the Netherlands
Entertainment companies of the Netherlands
Companies that filed for Chapter 11 bankruptcy in 2016
Electronic dance music record labels
Electronic music event management companies
Festival organizations in Europe